Ballerup Super Arena (formerly Siemens Arena) is a multi-purpose indoor arena, in Ballerup, Denmark. The velodrome has a seated capacity of 6,500. During concerts, the arena can accommodate an audience of up to 9,200. It is owned by Ballerup Municipality. The arena is also a venue for many company events, conferences, team building events, trade fairs, company sports events and cycling events.

The arena was opened in 2001. In 2003, the roof collapsed, as a result of a miscalculation in design and the new roof was reinforced with cables. It's the only international indoor velodrome in the Nordic countries.

Events
It hosts one of Denmark's two indoor velodromes and is often used for six-day racing and UCI Track Cycling World Cup Classics events. It was the host for the UCI Track Cycling World Championships in 2002 and 2010. The cycling track is a  track made of wood.

In 2009 it hosted the World Taekwondo Championships.

The arena hosted Dansk Melodi Grand Prix 2011 on 26 February, the first time Copenhagen hosted the competition since 2002.

It also hosted the 2014 BWF World Championships.

See also
List of indoor arenas in Denmark
List of indoor arenas in Nordic countries

References

External links

 

Cycle racing in Denmark
Indoor arenas in Denmark
Sports venues in Copenhagen
Velodromes in Denmark
Taekwondo venues
Sports venues completed in 2001